Senator Violette may refer to:

Elmer H. Violette (1921–2000), Maine State Senate
Paul Elmer Violette (born 1955), Maine State Senate